Hindi literature includes literature in the various Hindi language which have writing systems. Earliest forms of Hindi literature are attested in poetry of Apabhraṃśa like Awadhi, Magadhi, Ardhamagadhi and Marwari languages. Hindi literature is composed in three broad styles- गद्य (Gadya-prose), पद्य( Padya- poetry) and चम्प्पू (Campū -Prosimetrum.) In terms of historical development, it is broadly classified into five prominent forms (genres) based on the date of production. They are:
 Ādi Kāl /Vīr-Gāthā Kāl (आदि काल/वीरगाथा काल) --        [prior to & including 14th century CE.] This period was marked by Poems extolling brave warriors.

 Bhakti Kāl (भक्ति काल) --[14th–18th century CE.]               Prominent genre in this period was Poems of Devotion due to Bhakti Movement.

 Rīti Kāl /Śṛṅgār Kāl (रीति काल/ शृंगार काल) -- [18th–20th century CE.]                                                           The major genre of this period is Poems of Romance which are marked with high ornamentalism.

 Ādhunik Kāl (आधुनिक काल) -- [from 1850 CE onwards.]                                                                           Literally means Modern literature.
 Nayvottar Kāl (नव्योत्तर काल) -- [from 1980 CE onwards.]                                                                          Literally means Post- Modern literature.

The literature was produced in dialects such as Khariboli, Braj, Bundeli, Awadhi, Kannauji, as well as Marwari, Magahi, Bhojpuri and Chhattisgarhi. From the 20th century, works produced in Standard Hindi, a register of Hindustani written in the Devanagari script, are sometimes regarded as the only basis of modern literature in Hindi.

History

Adi Kal or Vir-Gatha kal (c. 1050 to 1375) 
Literature of Adi kal (c. before the 15th century CE) was developed in the regions of Kannauj, Delhi, Ajmer stretching up to central India. Prithviraj Raso, an epic poem written by Chand Bardai (1149 – c. 1200), is considered one of the first works in the history of Hindi literature. Chand Bardai was a court poet of Prithviraj Chauhan, the famous ruler of Delhi and Ajmer during the invasion of Muhammad of Ghor.

Jayachandra, the last ruler of Kannauj gave more patronage to Sanskrit rather than local dialects. Harsha, the author of Naishdhiya Charitra, was his court poet. Jagnayak (sometimes Jagnik), the royal poet in Mahoba, and Nalha, the royal poet in Ajmer, were the other prominent literary figures in this period. However, after Prithviraj Chauhan's defeat in the Second Battle of Tarain, most literary works belonging to this period were destroyed by the army of Muhammad of Ghor. Very few scriptures and manuscripts from this period are available and their genuineness is also doubted.

Some Siddha and Nathpanthi poetical works belonging to this period are also found, but their genuineness is again, doubted. The Siddhas belonged to the Vajrayana, a later Buddhist sect. Some scholars argue that the language of Siddha poetry is not an earlier form of Hindi, but Magadhi Prakrit. Nathpanthis were yogis who practised the Hatha yoga. Some Jain and Rasau (heroic poets) poetry works are also available from this period.

In the Deccan region in South India, Dakkhini or Hindavi was used. It flourished under the Delhi Sultanate and later under the Nizams of Hyderabad. It was written in the Persian script. Nevertheless, the Hindavi literature can be considered proto-Hindi literature. Many Deccani experts like Sheikh Ashraf or Mulla Vajahi used the word Hindavi to describe this dialect. Others such as Roustami, Nishati etc. preferred to call it Deccani. Shah Buharnuddin Janam Bijapuri used to call it Hindi. The first Deccani author was Khwaja Bandanawaz Gesudaraz Muhammad Hasan. He wrote three prose works – Mirazul Aashkini, Hidayatnama and Risala Sehwara. His grandson Abdulla Hussaini wrote Nishatul Ishq. The first Deccani poet was Nizami.

During the later part of this period and early Bhakti Kala, many saint-poets like Ramanand and Gorakhnath became famous. The earliest form of Hindi can also be seen in some of Vidyapati's Maithili works.

Bhakti kaal (c. 1375 to 1700) 
The medieval Hindi literature is marked by the influence of Bhakti movement and composition of long, epic poems.

Awadhi and Braj Bhasha were the dialects in which literature was developed. The main works in Avadhi are Malik Muhammad Jayasi's Padmavat and Tulsidas's Ramacharitamanas. The major works in Braj dialect are Tulsidas's Vinaya Patrika and Surdas's Sur Sagar. Sadhukaddi was also a language commonly used, especially by Kabir in his poetry and dohas.

The Bhakti period also marked great theoretical development in poetry forms chiefly from a mixture of older forms of poetry. These included Verse Patterns like Doha (two-liners), Sortha, Chaupaya (four-liners) etc. This was also the age when Poetry was characterised under the various Rasas. Unlike the Adi Kaal (also called the Vir Gatha Kaal) which was characterised by an overdose of Poetry in the Vir Rasa (Heroic Poetry), the Bhakti Yug marked a much more diverse and vibrant form of poetry which spanned the whole gamut of rasas from Shringara rasa (love), Vir Rasa (Heroism).

Bhakti poetry had two schools – the Nirguna school (the believers of a formless God or an abstract name) and the Saguna school (the believers of a God with attributes and worshippers of Vishnu's incarnations). Kabir and Guru Nanak belong to the Nirguna school, and their philosophy was greatly influenced by the Advaita Vedanta philosophy of Adi Sankaracharya. They believed in the concept of Nirgun Nirakaar Brahma or the Shapeless Formless One. The Saguna school was represented by mainly Vaishnava poets like Surdas, Tulsidas and others and was a logical extension of the Dvaita and Vishishta Advaita Philosophy propounded by the likes of Madhavacharya etc. This school was chiefly Vaishnava in orientation as in seen in the main compositions like Ramacharitamanas, Sur Saravali, Sur Sagar extolling Rama and Krishna.

This was also the age of tremendous integration between the Hindu and the Islamic elements in the Arts with the advent of many Muslim Bhakti poets like Abdul Rahim Khan-I-Khana who was a minister to Mughal emperor Akbar and was also a great devotee of Krishna. The Nirgun School of Bhakti Poetry was also tremendously secular in nature and its propounders like Kabir and Guru Nanak had a large number of followers irrespective of caste or religion.

Riti-kavya kal (c. 1700 to 1900) 
In the Ritikavya or Ritismagra Kavya period, the erotic element became predominant in the Hindi literature. This era is called Riti (meaning 'procedure') because it was the age when poetic figures and theory were developed to the fullest. But this emphasis on poetry theory greatly reduced the emotional aspects of poetry—the main characteristic of the Bhakti movement—and the actual content of the poetry became less important. The Saguna School of the Bhakti Yug split into two schools (Rama bhakti and Krishna bhakti) somewhere in the interregnum of the Bhakti and the Reeti Eras. Although most Reeti works were outwardly related to Krishna Bhakti, their emphasis had changed from total devotion to the supreme being to the
Shringar or erotic aspects of Krishna's life—his Leela, his pranks with the Gopis in Braj, and the description of the physical beauty of Krishna and Radha,(Krishna's Consort). The poetry of Bihari, and Ghananand Das fit this bill. The most well known book from this age is the Bihari Satsai of Bihari, a collection of Dohas (couplets), dealing with Bhakti (devotion), Neeti (Moral policies) and Shringar (love).

The first Hindi books, using the Devanagari script or Nāgarī script were one Heera Lal's treatise on Ain-i-Akbari, called Ain e Akbari ki Bhasha Vachanika, and Rewa Maharaja's treatise on Kabir. Both books came out in 1795. Munshi Lallu Lal's Hindi translation of Sanskrit Hitopadesha was published in 1809. Lala Srinivas Das published a novel in Hindi Pariksha guru in the Nāgarī script in 1886. Shardha Ram Phillauri wrote a Hindi novel Bhagyawati which was published in 1888.

Chandrakanta, written by Devaki Nandan Khatri in 1888, is considered the first authentic work of prose in modern Hindi. The person who brought realism in the Hindi prose literature was Munshi Premchand, who is considered the most revered figure in the world of Hindi fiction and progressive movement.

Adhunik kal (c. 1900 onwards) 
In 1800, the British East India Company established Fort William College at Calcutta. The college president J. B. Gilchrist hired professors to write books in Hindustani. Some of these books were Prem Sagar by Lallu Lal, Naasiketopaakhyan by Sadal Mishra, Sukhsagar by Sadasukhlal of Delhi and Rani Ketaki ki kahani by Munshi Inshallah Khan.

The person who brought realism in the Hindi prose literature was Premchand, who is considered the most revered figure in the world of Hindi fiction and progressive movement. Before Premchand, the Hindi literature revolved around fairy or magical tales, entertaining stories and religious themes. Premchand's novels have been translated into many other languages.

Dwivedi Yug
The Dwivedi Yug ("Age of Dwivedi") in Hindi literature lasted from 1900 to 1918. It is named after Mahavir Prasad Dwivedi, who played a major role in establishing the modern Hindi language in poetry and broadening the acceptable subjects of the Hindi poetry from the traditional ones of religion and romantic love. He encouraged poetry in Hindi dedicated to nationalism and social reform.

Dwivedi became the editor of Saraswati in 1903, the first Hindi monthly magazine of India, which was established in 1900. He used it to crusade for reforms in the Hindi literature. One of the most prominent poems of the period was Maithili Sharan Gupt's Bharat-bharati, which evokes the past glory of India. Shridhar Prathak's Bharatgit is another renowned poem of the period.

Some scholars have labelled much of the poetry of this period as "versified propaganda". According to Lucy Rosenstein: "It is verse of public statement; its language is functional but aesthetically unappealing. Earnestly concerned with social issues and moral values, it is puritanical poetry in which aesthetic considerations are secondary. Imagination, originality, poetic sensibility and expression are wanting, the metre is restrictive, the idiom clumsy." She adds, however, that the period was important for laying the foundations to the modern Hindi poetry and that it did reflect sensitivity to social issues of the time. However, she also adds that the inelegance is a typical feature of a "young" poetry, as she considers Modern Hindi.

Without a poetic tradition in modern Hindi, poets often modeled their forms on Braj, and later on Sanskrit, Urdu, Bengali and English forms, often ill-suited to Hindi. The subjects of the poems tended to be communal rather than personal. Characters were often presented not as individuals but as social types.

Chhayavaadi Yug
In the 20th century, Hindi literature saw a romantic upsurge. This is known as Chhayavaad (shadowism) and the literary figures belonging to this school are known as Chhayavaadi. Jaishankar Prasad, Suryakant Tripathi 'Nirala', Mahadevi Varma and Sumitranandan Pant, are the four major Chhayavaadi poets. Poet Ramdhari Singh 'Dinkar' was another great poet with some Chayavaadi element in his poetry although he wrote in other genres as well.

This period of Neo-romanticism, represents the adolescence of Hindi Poetry. It is marked by beauty of expression and flow of intense emotion. The four representative poets of this era represent the best in Hindi Poetry. A unique feature of this period is the emotional (and sometimes active) attachment of poets with national freedom struggle, their effort to understand and imbibe the vast spirit of a magnificent ancient culture and their towering genius which grossly overshadowed all the literary 'talked abouts' of next seven decades.

Other important genres of Adhunik Sahitya (Modernism) are: Prayogvad (Experimentalism) of Ajneya and the Tar Saptak poets, also known as Nayi Kavita (New Poetry) and Nayi Kahani (New Story) of Nirmal Verma and others; followed by Pragativad (Progressivism) of Gajanan Madhav Muktibodh and other authors.

Nakenwad
Among the numerous schools of poetry which sprang up in the 1950s was Nakenwad, a school deriving its nomenclature from the first letters of the names of its three pioneers – Nalin Vilochan Sharma, Kesari Kumar, and Naresh Mehta all poets of note in their own right. Apart from being poets, Nalin Vilochan and Kesari Kumar were also brilliant critics, with a wide perspective on literary history. Their critical attitude is marked by a synthesis or coordination of various disciplines of human knowledge – philosophy, history, art and culture, all pressed into the service of literary appraisal and analysis.

Genres of Hindi Literature

Hindi Kavita (Poetry)
Hindi has a rich legacy of poetry.
Hasya Kavita is humorous comic poetry in Hindi. It is particularly famous due to Hindi kavi sammelans.
Bal kavita is children's rhymes in Hindi.

Many attempts have been made to document Hindi poetry. Some of the most comprehensive online collections for Hindi poetry are Kavitakosh and Kavita.
The most classy content that has created new audiences who were not looking for Hindi poetry or Hindi content is Hindi Kavita. This movement started in 2014 by Manish Gupta has generated an entirely new market and brought many projects to the fore. Many award-winning poets, scholars, journalists and celebrities from film, television and theatre have come forward to support the cause and take it further.

Vyangya (Hindi Satire)
The rhetoric of satire is called Vyangya in Hindi. Vyangya writings includes the essence of sarcasm and humour. Some of the better known writers in this genre are, Harishankar Parsai (Hindi: हरिशंकर परसाई) (22 August 1924 – 1995) was a Hindi writer. He was a noted satirist and humorist of modern Hindi literature and is known for his simple and direct style., Sri Lal Sukla, Suryakumar Pandey etc.

Hindi travel literature
Rahul Sankrityayan, Bhadant Anand Kausalyayan, Sachchidananda Hirananda Vatsyayan 'Ajneya' and Baba Nagarjun were some of the great Indian writers who dedicated themselves entirely to the Hindi Travel Literature (Yatra Vritanta). Rahul Sankrityayan was one of the greatest travelled scholars of India, spending forty-five years of his life on travels away from his home. He is known as the ("Father of Hindi Travel literature"). Baba Nagarjun was a major Hindi and Maithili poet who has also penned a number of novels, short stories, literary biographies and travelogues, and was known as ("Janakavi- the People's Poet").

Hindi playwriting
The pioneer of Hindi theatre as well as playwrighting, Bhartendu Harishchandra wrote Satya Harishchandra (1875), Bharat Durdasha (1876) and Andher Nagari (1878), in the late 19th century, Jaishankar Prasad became the next big figure in Hindi playwriting with plays like Skanda Gupta (1928), Chandragupta (1931) and Dhruvswamini (1933).

As the Independence struggle was gathering steam playwrights broaching issues of nationalism and subversive ideas against the British, yet to dodge censorship they adapted themes from mythology, history and legend and used them as vehicle for political messages, a trend that continues to date, though now it was employed to bring out social, personal and psychological issues rather than clearly political, though street theatre broke this trend in coming decades in post-independence era, like IPTA-inspired, Naya Theatre of Habib Tanvir did in the 1950s–90s, Jana Natya Manch of Safdar Hashmi did in the 1970s–80s. Post-independence the emerging republic threw up new issues for playwrights to tackle and express, and Hindi playwriting showed greater brevity and symbolism, but it was not as prolific as in case with Hindi poetry or fiction. Yet we have playwrights like Jagdish Chandra Mathur (Konark) and Upendranath Ashk (Anjo Didi), who displayed a steadily evolving understanding of stagecraft. These were followed another generation of pioneers in Hindi playwrighting, Mohan Rakesh, who started with Ashadh Ka Ek Din (1958), Adhe Adhure and Lehron Ke Rajhans, Dharamvir Bharati, who wrote Andha Yug, and other playwrights like Surendra Verma, and Bhisham Sahni.

Hindi essay-writing
Kuber Nath Rai is one of the writers who dedicated themselves entirely to the form of essay-writing. His collections of essays Gandha Madan, Priya neel-kanti, Ras Aakhetak, Vishad Yog, Nishad Bansuri, Parna mukut have enormously enriched the form of essay.
A scholar of Indian culture and western literature, he was proud of Indian heritage. His love for natural beauty and Indian folk literatures and preference for agricultural society over the age of machines, his romantic outlook, aesthetic sensibility, his keen eye on contemporary reality and classical style place him very high among contemporary essayists in Hindi.

Prominent figures

 Chand Bardai (1148–1191), author of Prithviraj Raso.
 Vidyapati (1352–1448), a prominent poet of Eastern dialects.
 Kabir (1398–1518), a major figure of the bhakti (devotional) movement.
 Surdas (1467–1583), author of Sahitya Lahari, Sur Saravali, Sur Sagar etc.
 Malik Muhammad Jayasi (1477–1542), author of the Padmavat (1540) etc.
 Mirabai (1504–1560), author of Mira Padavali etc.
 Tulsidas (1532–1623), author of Ramacharitamanas, Vinay Patrika etc.
 Keshavdas (1555–1617), author of Rasikpriya etc.
 Raskhan (1548–1628), a major figure of the bhakti (devotional) movement.
 Banarasidas (1586–1643) who is known for his poetic autobiography - Ardhakathānaka, (The Half Story),.
 Bihari (1595–1664) became famous by writing Satasai (Seven Hundred Verses).
 Bhushan (1612–1713), author of Shivabavani, Chhatrasal Dashak  etc.
 Vrind (1643–1723), author of Nitisatsai, Vrind Satsai etc.
 Guru Gobind Singh (1669–1708), author of Bichitra Natak etc.
 Sūdan (1700–1753), author of Sujān Charitra etc.
 Lallu Lal (1763–1835), translator of Baital Pachisi, Shakuntala etc., and author of Prem Sagar, etc.
 Ganga Das (1823–1913), author of about fifty kavya-granthas and thousands of padas, he is known as Bhismpitama of the Hindi poetry.
 Bharatendu Harishchandra (1850–1885), author of Andher Nagari etc.; his works are compiled in Bharatendu Granthavali.
 Devaki Nandan Khatri (1861–1913), author of mystery novels like Chandrakanta, Bhootnath, etc.
 Mahavir Prasad Dwivedi (1864–1938), author of Kavya Manjusha, Sugandh, Sahitya Sandarbh, Sahitya Vichar, etc.
 Munshi Premchand (1880–1936), considered one of the greatest Hindi novelists of all time. His novels include Godaan, Karmabhoomi, Gaban, Mansarovar, Idgah, etc.
 Maithili Sharan Gupt (1886–1964), author of Saket, Yashodhara, etc.
 Jaishankar Prasad (1889–1937), poet, novelist, playwright, stalwart of the literary Chhayavaadi movement. His greatest works are Kamayani, Dhruvswamini, Skandagupta, etc.
 Makhanlal Chaturvedi (1889–1968), first recipient of Sahitya Akademi Award in Hindi for his work Him Taringini, works include Yug Charan, Pushp Ki Abhilasha, etc.
 Rahul Sankrityayan (1893–1962), the father of Indian travelled literature.
 Suryakant Tripathi 'Nirala' (1896–1961), one of the "four pillars" of the Chhayavaad movement.
 Sumitranandan Pant, (1900–1977) eminent Hindi poet who wrote mainly on nature.
 Yashpal (1903–1976), author of Jhutha Sach, Meri Teri Uski Baat, etc.
 Jainendra Kumar (1905–1988), An extremely influential figure in 20th-century Hindi literature.
 Hazariprasad Dwivedi (1907–1979), novelist, literary historian.
 Mahadevi Varma (1907–1987), one of the "four pillars" of the Chhayavaad movement.
 Ramdhari Singh Dinkar (1908–1974), hailed as a Rashtrakavi.
 Nagarjun (1911–1998), hailed as Janakavi (The People's Poet).
 Bhisham Sahni (1915–2003), novelist, playwright, author of Tamas, Madhavi, etc.
 Nalin Vilochan Sharma (1916–1961), one of the pioneers of Nakenwad movement.
 Phanishwar Nath 'Renu' (1921–1977), novelist best known for Maila Anchal, Juloos, etc.
 Harishankar Parsai (1922–1995), known for satirical works.
 Naresh Mehta (1922–2000), poet, playwright, one of the pioneers of Nakenwad movement.
 Mohan Rakesh (1925–1972), novelist, playwright known for Ashadh Ka Ek Din, Andhere Band Kamre, Na Aane Wala Kal, etc.
 Dharmavir Bharati (1926–1997), a renowned writer, author of Gunaho Ka Devta, Suraj Ka Satvan Ghoda, etc.
 Raghuvir Sahay (1929–1990) was a versatile Hindi poet, translator, short-story writer and journalist.
 Nirmal Verma (1929–2005), one of the founders of the Nai Kahani literary movement.
 Kamleshwar (1932–2007), author of Kitne Pakistan.
 Dushyant Kumar (1933–1975), prominent Hindi poet snd composer of ghazals.
 Kashinath Singh (1937–) author of Rehan Par Ragghu, Kashi Ka Assi, etc.
 Narendra Kohli (1940–2021), known for reinventing the ancient form of epic writing in modern prose.
 Geetanjali Shree (1957–), author of Ret Samadhi which won the International Booker Prize in 2022

Eminent Hindi journalists

Bharatendu Harishchandra

Bharatendu Harishchandra began his career as a journalist at the age of 17. Published Kavi Vachan Sudha (1867) a monthly dedicated to ancient and medieval poetry. Published Harishchandra Magazine in 1873 – a general interest magazine.
Published Bala Bodhini from 1874 – for women and young girls.

KVS was acknowledged to be the finest literary journal in any Indian language of that time, and was on par with the best of English journals. Bharatendu kept the journal up until his death 1885.
Because of his extraordinary achievements, he is considered the most prolific Hindi journalist.

Madan Mohan Malaviya

Madan Mohan Malaviya was born in 1861 in Allahabad to a Brahmin family. From 1885 to 1887 was the editor of Indian Opinion. He was a strong supporter of the Congress. He helped launch the newspaper Dainik Hindustan and was its editor from 1887 to 1889. He was a close friend of many eminent Hindi writers like Gopalram Gehmari, Amrutlal Chakravarty and Pandit Pratap Narayan Mishra.

Along with Bal Mukund Gupta, he launched an Urdu journal 'Kohinoor' from Lahore. In those days, Gupta was not a facile Hindi scholar, but under Malviya's training, Gupta became editor of Bharat Mitra.
In 1908, Malviya founded a new revolutionary journal Abhyudaya from Prayag. The renowned writer Purushottam Das Tandon was a frequent contributor to it.

After Abhyudaya, Malviya founded a monthly magazine 'Maryada', in 1909 he founded a daily 'Leader' and later on another daily – 'Bharat'.

Malviya was a great patriot and his love for his country was seen in all of his writings.
He also contributed to Aaj, and helped to found the Hindustan Times in 1933, along with its Hindi counterpart Hindustan.
Babu Gulabrai (17 January 1888 – 13 April 1963) (pen name: Gulabrai MA) was one of the greatest literary figures of modern Hindi literature.

Durgaprasad Mishra

Born in Kashmir, he came to Calcutta and started Bharat Mitra in 1878.
In 1879, he began another weekly magazine- Saar Sudhanidhi but it closed down in that same year. On 17 August 1880, he started a 3rd weekly- Ucchit Vakta- meaning Right or Best Time.  Ucchit Vakta focused on spreading the truth (about the British Raj) and fighting for justice. It became very popular for many years.

Mishra underwent a lot of difficulties trying to bring out a critical publication at the time of the British Raj. At times he was the editor, writer and also sold the paper himself.
He was an inspiration for many journalists, particularly Bal Mukund Gupta.

Dharmvir Bharati

Born on 25 December 1926, Dharamvir Bharati graduated in BA (first class) in 1945 and in 1947 completed his MA in Hindi literature (first class) and finally did his PhD from Allahabad University. For some time he was principal of Allahabad University.

He began his journalist career in Abhyudaya, a journal by Padmakant Malviya. He then joined Sangam, edited by Ilachand Joshi and then became editor of Dharmayug. Thanks to Bharati, this journal became very popular.

During the 1971 war, Bharati reported from the frontlines of the battle. He covered all the horrors of the war. His series of reports, the finest in Hindi war journalism, were published under the title of 'Yudh Yatra'. As an honest and dedicated reporter, Bharati was unrivaled. After the war, he became editor of 2 more journals- Aalochana and Nikarshak.

Bharati was also famous as a short story writer, poet, essayist and novelist. The best known of his works are 'Band Galli ka Aakhiri Makaan', 'Andha Yug', 'Kunpriya'.

See also 

 Mahatma Gandhi Antarrashtriya Hindi Vishwavidyalaya, an Indian central university with a literary focus
 Hindustani orthography

References

Bibliography

Further reading
 Hindi Literature, by Ram Awadh Dwivedi. Published by Hindi Pracharak Pustakalaya, 1953.
 A History of Hindi literature, by K. B. Jindal. Published by Kitab Mahal, 1955.
 Hindi Literature from Its Beginnings to the Nineteenth Century, by Ronald Stuart McGregor. Published by Harrassowitz, 1984. .
 Hindi Literature of the Nineteenth and Early Twentieth Centuries, by Ronald Stuart McGregor. Published by Harrassowitz, 1974. .
 A New Voice for New Times: The Development of Modern Hindi Literature, by Ronald Stuart McGregor. Faculty of Asian Studies, Australian National University, 1981. .
 An Encyclopaedia of World Hindi Literature, by Ganga Ram Garg. Published by Concept Pub. Co., 1986.

External links

 Hindi Language and Literature

Hindi
Indian literature
Hindi-language literature
Literature by language
Indian literature by language